Poulton-with-Fearnhead is a civil parish and suburb of Warrington, in the Borough of Warrington, Cheshire, England.  According to the 2001 census it had a population of 17,019.  The parish includes northern and eastern suburbs of Warrington, including Padgate, Fearnhead, Cinnamon Brow, Blackbrook, Longbarn, Bruche and Paddington.

From northwards clockwise, it borders the parishes of Croft (at a point on a motorway junction), Birchwood, Woolston, the unparished area of Warrington, then the parish of Winwick.

See also

Listed buildings in Poulton-with-Fearnhead

References

Warrington
Villages in Cheshire
Civil parishes in Warrington